Glezen Glacier is a glacier that flows east from Endeavour Massif in the Kirkwood Range of Victoria Land, Antarctica. The glacier flows along the north side of Ketchum Ridge to Tripp Ice Tongue. It was named after Lieutenant Commander Glenn F. Glezen, U.S. Navy, Administrative Officer, Task Force 43, on Operation Deep Freeze I and IV, 1955–56 and 1958–59.  Lieutenant Commander Glezen was the Financial Aide for Admiral Richard Byrd.

References

Glaciers of Victoria Land
Scott Coast